MS Carnival Luminosa (formerly Costa Luminosa) is a cruise ship operated by Carnival Cruise Line. Originally built as the Costa Luminosa, the ship entered service on 5 May 2009. A sister ship, was launched in February 2010 and is based on the same design. Costa Luminosa departed Civitavecchia, Italy on 3 June 2009, on her 13-night maiden voyage, with ports of call in Savona, St. Tropez, Barcelona, Lisbon, Le Havre and Amsterdam. On 14 June 2022, it was announced that Costa Luminosa would be transferred to the fleet of Carnival Cruise Line, receiving the name Carnival Luminosa. The transfer and refit for Carnival has since been completed. The ship has begun sailing for Carnival as of November 6th.

Design and description

The ship has 1,130 cabins, four dining areas, a theatre, a cinema and other passenger facilities.

Construction and career

Costa Luminosa
Costa Luminosa and her sister ship, Costa Deliziosa were ordered from the Fincantieri Marghera shipyard on 12 June 2006.  The keel of Costa Luminosa was laid on 10 October 2007 in the Fincantieri Marghera shipyard at Venice. She floated out of drydock on 30 June 2008 and completed her sea trials on 30 March 2009. After 18 months, the ship was handed over to Costa Cruises on 1 May 2009.

The christenings of Costa Luminosa, and the  Costa Pacifica were held in Genoa on 5 June 2009. It was the first time that two cruise ships were simultaneously christened in Italy. The dual christening ceremony set a then Guinness World record in the category, "Most ships inaugurated in one day by one company". The two ships also launched simultaneously in their shipyard on 5 June 2008; Costa Luminosa in Marghera and Costa Pacifica in Sestri Ponente.

Costa Luminosa made her first vernissage cruise on 5 May 2009, a 10-day cruise in the Eastern Mediterranean, departing Venice, with ports of call at Istanbul, Bari, Olympia, Rhodes, Smyrna, Mykonos and Athens. It was followed by mini cruises in Eastern Mediterranean, again departing Venice on 15 May 2009. Her second vernissage cruise was on 19 May 2009. In the summer of 2009, the ship offered 11 and 14-day cruises at the Baltic capitals, Norwegian fjords and the North Cape.

During the 2009–2010 winter season, the ship operated in Dubai, offering seven-day cruises in the Persian Gulf with calls at Dubai, Muscat, Fujairah, Abu Dhabi, and Bahrain. After the political problems in Bahrain, the company changed the itinerary removing Bahrain.

Despite claims of sustainable practices by both Costa Cruises and its parent company Carnival, Costa Luminosa continually dumped the toilet waste of its 3,200 passengers and crew in the sea, instead of taking use of harbour facilities, often provided free of charge by Baltic ports.

From 2017 every summer she sails on seven-night cruises to the Greek Islands. During the winter period Costa Luminosa goes on seven-night cruises in the Caribbean.

She spent her final season for Costa, sailing seven-night cruises to the Greek Islands.

Transfer to Carnival Cruise Line 

On 14 June 2022, it was announced that Costa Luminosa would be transferred to the fleet of Carnival Cruise Line in September 2022, receiving the name Carnival Luminosa. 

Initially when Carnival Luminosa makes it Carnival debut in October 2022, the ship will not have all the Fun Ship 2.0 features found within the rest of the fleet, and will receive those features at a later point in time, but as noted it will have a Carnival Cruise Line crew. 

Carnival Luminosa will receive the following during its dry dock at Palermo; Playlist Production, Piano Bar 88, RedFrog Rum Bar, Limelight Lounge, Alchemy Bar and the Punchliner Comedy Club. 

It will also receive Carnival's Serenity, have its spa transformed into the brand's Cloud 9 Spa, dining venue makeover include Fahrenheit 555 Steakhouse, Chef’s Table and Bonsai Sushi Express.

Carnival Luminosa'''s inaugural season will kick off in November 2022 and will sail a mix of 3 to 11 night cruises in the Australia/New Zealand region from Brisbane, Australia. A head of its first Alaska season from Seattle, Washington, the ship will sail a 22 night transpacific cruise. Upon conclusion of the Alaska season, the ship will sail a rare 30 night voyage back to Brisbane.

On September 8, 2022, Costa Luminosa was officially handed over to Carnival Cruise Line. After a refit, the ship sailed to Brisbane, Australia to begin voyages that started on November 6th. 

 Incidents 

 Coronavirus pandemic 

On 29 February 2020, a 68-year-old Italian man in critical condition was transferred from Costa Luminosa to a hospital in the Cayman Islands due to heart issues.  On 12 March 2020, the Health Services Authority of the Cayman Islands announced that the man was their first confirmed coronavirus case.  His death was announced two days later.

On 5 March 2020 the vessel left Fort Lauderdale for a transatlantic cruise. Two people disembarked with symptoms of the coronavirus in Puerto Rico. Subsequently, on 13 March 2020, it was confirmed to be due to coronavirus disease 2019 – the first known cases in Puerto Rico. One of the two persons died several days later.  Because of the virus outbreak several sick passengers were left at Tenerife and passengers were placed under quarantine in their rooms. The ship was not allowed to dock in Spain. It docked at Marseille, France, discharging sick passengers who flew home distributing the virus, and went to Savona where the rest of the passengers were disembarked on 23 March, many of them sick. After the disembarkation at Marseille, French authorities confirmed 36 people with COVID-19 infection. On 21 March local news in Puerto Rico reported the death of the quarantined Italian woman. On 7 April, a Miami lawyer filed a lawsuit against Costa Cruises over mishandling and allowing passengers to sail aboard Costa Luminosa'' despite having flu-like symptoms.

Similar ships

  - a similar class of Panamax ships operated by Royal Caribbean International
  - a similar Panamax ship operated by P&O Cruises.
  - a similar Panamax sized ship operated by Cunard Line.
  and  - a similar set of Panamax ships operated by Princess Cruises

References

External links 

 

Ships of Carnival Cruise Line
Ships of Costa Cruises
Ships built in Venice
Panamax cruise ships
2008 ships
Ships built by Fincantieri
Cruise ships involved in the COVID-19 pandemic